The Bridge Street Historic District in Las Vegas, New Mexico was listed on the National Register of Historic Places in 1978. The listing included 28 contributing buildings and a contributing structure.

It includes the Gallinas River Bridge and the 100 block of Bridge St., which was a wagon road before 1879.

It abuts the Las Vegas Plaza historic district, which also is listed on the National Register.

References

Historic districts on the National Register of Historic Places in New Mexico
National Register of Historic Places in San Miguel County, New Mexico
Italianate architecture in New Mexico